Tuomastornit is an observation tower located in Padasjoki, Finland. The observation is about 14 meters tall and it was completed in 2013. The tower is built mainly of glued laminated timber which ensures it can endure large number of visitors.

The observation tower has two parts: lower Pikku-Tuomas (little Tuomas) and taller Iso-Tuomas (Big Tuomas). Tuomas is a male given name common in Finland. It is the Finnish version of the name Thomas.

External links
 Tuomastornit observation tower, Tripadvisor

References

Towers completed in 2013
Buildings and structures in Päijät-Häme
Observation towers in Finland
Tourist attractions in Päijät-Häme